The United States Code is the official compilation of the Federal laws of a general and permanent nature that are currently in force. Title 36 cover, "Patriotic and National Observances, Ceremonies, and Organizations."

Parts

Subtitle I: Patriotic and National Observances and Ceremonies

Part A: Observances and Ceremonies
Chapter 1: Patriotic and National Observances
§ 101. American Heart Month
§ 102. Asian/Pacific American Heritage Month
§ 103. Cancer Control Month
§ 104. Carl Garner Federal Lands Cleanup Day
§ 105. Child Health Day
§ 106. Constitution Day and Citizenship Day
§ 107. Columbus Day
§ 108. Constitution Week
§ 109. Father's Day
§ 110. Flag Day
§ 111. Gold Star Mother's Day
§ 112. Honor America Days
§ 113. Law Day, U.S.A.
§ 114. Leif Erikson Day
§ 115. Loyalty Day
§ 116. Memorial Day
§ 117. Mother's Day
§ 118. National Aviation Day
§ 119. National Day of Prayer
§ 120. National Defense Transportation Day
§ 121. National Disability Employment Awareness Month
§ 122. National Flag Week
§ 123. National Forest Products Week
§ 124. National Freedom Day
§ 125. National Grandparents Day
§ 126. National Hispanic Heritage Month
§ 127. National Korean War Veterans Armistice Day
§ 128. National Maritime Day
§ 129. National Pearl Harbor Remembrance Day
§ 130. National Poison Prevention Week
§ 131. National Safe Boating Week
§ 132. National School Lunch Week
§ 133. National Transportation Week
§ 134. Pan American Aviation Day
§ 135. Parents' Day
§ 136. Peace Officers Memorial Day
§ 137. Police Week
§ 138. Save Your Vision Week
§ 139. Steelmark Month
§ 140. Stephen Foster Memorial Day
§ 141. Thomas Jefferson's birthday
§ 142. White Cane Safety Day
§ 143. Wright Brothers Day
§ 144. Patriot Day
§ 145. Veterans Day
§ 189. National POW/MIA Recognition Day
Chapter 3: National Anthem, Motto, Floral Emblem, and March
§ 301. National anthem
§ 302. National motto
§ 303. National floral emblem
§ 304. National march
§ 305. National tree
Chapter 5: Presidential Inaugural Ceremonies
§ 501. Definitions
§ 502. Regulations, licenses, and registration tags
§ 503. Use of reservations, grounds, and public spaces
§ 504. Installation and removal of electrical facilities
§ 505. Extension of wires along parade routes
§ 506. Duration of regulations and licenses and publication of regulations
§ 507. Application to other property
§ 508. Enforcement
§ 509. Penalty
§ 510. Disclosure of and prohibition on certain donations
§ 511. Authorization of appropriations
Chapter 7: Federal Participation in Carl Garner Federal Lands Cleanup Day
§ 702. Definition
§ 703. Duties of Federal land management agency
§ 704. Activities
Chapter 9: Miscellaneous
§ 901. Service flag and service lapel button
§ 902. National League of Families 
§ 903. Designation of Medal of Honor Flag

Part B: United States Government Organizations Involved with Observances and Ceremonies 
Chapter 21: American Battle Monuments Commission
§. 2101. Membership
§. 2102. Employment of personnel
§. 2103. Administrative
§. 2104. Military cemeteries in foreign countries
§. 2105. Monuments built by the United States Government
§. 2106. War memorials not built by the United States Government
§. 2107. National Memorial Cemetery of the Pacific
§. 2108. Pacific War Memorial and other historical and memorial sites on Corregidor
§. 2109. Foreign Currency Fluctuations Account
§. 2110. Claims against the Commission
§. 2111. Presidential duties and powers
§. 2112. Care and maintenance of Surrender Tree site
§. 2113. World War II memorial in the District of Columbia
§. 2114. Intellectual property and related items
Chapter 23: United States Holocaust Memorial Museum
§. 2301. Establishment of the United States Holocaust Memorial Museum; functions
§. 2302. Functions of the Council; membership
§. 2303. Compensation; travel expenses; full-time officers or employees of United States or Members of Congress
§. 2304. Administrative provisions
§. 2305. Staff
§. 2306. Insurance for Museum
§. 2307. Gifts, bequests, and devises of property; tax treatment
§. 2308. Annual report
§. 2309. Audit of financial transactions
§. 2310. Authorization of appropriations
Chapter 25: President's Committee on Employment of People with Disabilities
§. 2501. Acceptance of voluntary services and money or property
§. 2502. Authorization of appropriations

Subtitle II: Patriotic and National Organizations

Part A: General 
Chapter 101: General
§. 10101. Audits
§. 10102. Reservation of right to amend or repeal

Part B: Organizations
Chapter 201: Agricultural Hall of Fame
Chapter 202: Air Force Sergeants Association
Chapter 203: American Academy of Arts and Letters
Chapter 205: American Chemical Society
Chapter 207: American Council of Learned Societies
Chapter 209: American Ex-Prisoners of War
Chapter 210: American GI Forum of the United States
Chapter 211: American Gold Star Mothers, Incorporated
Chapter 213: American Historical Association
Chapter 215: American Hospital of Paris
Chapter 217: The American Legion
Chapter 219: The American National Theater and Academy
Chapter 221: The American Society of International Law
Chapter 223: American Symphony Orchestra League
Chapter 225: American War Mothers
Chapter 227: AMVETS (American Veterans of World War II, Korea, and Vietnam)
Chapter 229: Army and Navy Union of the United States of America
Chapter 231: Aviation Hall of Fame
Chapter 301: Big Brothers Big Sisters of America
Chapter 303: Blinded Veterans Association
Chapter 305: Blue Star Mothers of America, Inc.
Chapter 307: Board for Fundamental Education
Chapter 309: Boy Scouts of America
Chapter 311: Boys & Girls Clubs of America
Chapter 401: Catholic War Veterans of the United States of America, Incorporated
Chapter 403: Civil Air Patrol
Chapter 405: Congressional Medal of Honor Society of the United States of America
Chapter 407: Corporation for the Promotion of Rifle Practice and Firearms Safety
Chapter 501: Daughters of Union Veterans of the Civil War 1861-1865
Chapter 503: Disabled American Veterans
Chapter 601: 82nd Airborne Division Association, Incorporated (see 82d Airborne Division)
Chapter 701: Fleet Reserve Association
Chapter 703: Former Members of Congress
Chapter 705: The Foundation of the Federal Bar Association (See Federal Bar Association)
Chapter 707: Frederick Douglass Memorial and Historical Association (See Frederick Douglass National Historic Site)
Chapter 709: National FFA Organization
Chapter 801: General Federation of Women's Clubs
Chapter 803: Girl Scouts of the United States of America
Chapter 805: Gold Star Wives of America
Chapter 901: Reserved
Chapter 1001: Italian American War Veterans of the United States
Chapter 1101: Jewish War Veterans of the United States of America, Incorporated
Chapter 1103: Jewish War Veterans, U.S.A., National Memorial, Incorporated
Chapter 1201: Reserved
Chapter 1301: Ladies of the Grand Army of the Republic (See Grand Army of the Republic)
Chapter 1303: Legion of Valor of the United States of America, Incorporated
Chapter 1305: Little League Baseball, Incorporated
Chapter 1401: Marine Corps League
Chapter 1403: The Military Chaplains Association of the United States of America
Chapter 1404: Military Officers Association of America
Chapter 1405: Military Order of the Purple Heart of the United States of America, Incorporated (See Purple Heart)
Chapter 1407: Military Order of the World Wars
Chapter 1501: National Academy of Public Administration
Chapter 1503: National Academy of Sciences
Chapter 1505: National Conference of State Societies, Washington, District of Columbia
Chapter 1507: National Conference On Citizenship
Chapter 1509: National Council On Radiation Protection and Measurements
Chapter 1511: National Education Association of the United States
Chapter 1513: National Fallen Firefighters Foundation (See National Fallen Firefighters Memorial))
Chapter 1515: National Federation of Music Clubs
Chapter 1517: National Film Preservation Foundation
Chapter 1519: National Fund for Medical Education
Chapter 1521: National Mining Hall of Fame and Museum
Chapter 1523: National Music Council
Chapter 1524: National Recording Preservation Foundation (See National Recording Preservation Board)
Chapter 1525: National Safety Council
Chapter 1527: National Ski Patrol System, Incorporated
Chapter 1529: National Society, Daughters of the American Colonists
Chapter 1531: The National Society of the Daughters of the American Revolution
Chapter 1533: National Society of the Sons of the American Revolution
Chapter 1535: National Tropical Botanical Garden
Chapter 1537: National Woman's Relief Corps, Auxiliary to the Grand Army of the Republic
Chapter 1539: The National Yeomen F (see Yeoman (F))
Chapter 1541: Naval Sea Cadet Corps
Chapter 1543: Navy Club of the United States of America
Chapter 1545: Navy Wives Clubs of America
Chapter 1547: Non Commissioned Officers Association of the United States of America, Incorporated
Chapter 1601: Reserved
Chapter 1701: Paralyzed Veterans of America
Chapter 1703: Pearl Harbor Survivors Association
Chapter 1705: Polish Legion of American Veterans, U.S.A.
Chapter 1801: Reserved
Chapter 1901: Reserve Officers Association of the United States
Chapter 1903: Retired Enlisted Association, Incorporated
Chapter 2001: Society of American Florists and Ornamental Horticulturists
Chapter 2003: Sons of Union Veterans of the Civil War
Chapter 2101: Theodore Roosevelt Association
Chapter 2103: 369th Veterans' Association
Chapter 2201: United Service Organizations, Incorporated
Chapter 2203: United States Capitol Historical Society
Chapter 2205: United States Olympic Committee
Chapter 2207: United States Submarine Veterans of World War II
Chapter 2301: Veterans of Foreign Wars of the United States
Chapter 2303: Veterans of World War I of the United States of America, Incorporated
Chapter 2305: Vietnam Veterans of America, Inc.
Chapter 2401: Women's Army Corps Veterans' Association
Chapter 2501: Reserved
Chapter 2601: Reserved
Chapter 2701: Reserved

Subtitle III: Treaty Obligation Organizations
Chapter 3001: The American National Red Cross

See also
Congressional charter
Public holidays in the United States

References

External links

U.S. Code Title 36 at Cornell University
U.S. Code Title 36 at the U.S. Government Publishing Office